Font-Romeu-Odeillo-Via, or simply Odeillo, is a commune in the Pyrénées-Orientales and Cerdagne near the Spanish border in the south of France. It comprises the villages of Odeillo and Via, as well as Font-Romeu, one of the oldest ski resorts in France and the oldest in the Pyrenees.

Geography

Localization 
Font-Romeu-Odeillo-Via is located in the canton of Les Pyrénées catalanes and in the arrondissement of Prades. It is bordered by the communes of Angoustrine-Villeneuve-des-Escaldes, Targasonne, Égat, Estavar, Saillagouse, Eyne and Bolquère.

Transportation 
Font-Romeu-Odeillo-Via station is served by the Yellow Train line, a railway which runs from Villefranche-de-Conflent through to Latour-de-Carol.

Toponymy 
The names of Odeillo and Via appear in 839 as parrochia Hodellone et parrochia Avizano.

The name Font-Romeu means in Catalan "fountain of the pilgrim".

History 
Odeillo and Via were both mentioned for the first time in 839 among the places paying a fee to La Seu d'Urgell church. Nevertheless, Odeillo was at the time part of the County of Cerdanya, while Via was a property of the Urg family.

On 15 July 1035, Wifred II, Count of Cerdanya, gave Odeillo to the Abbey of Saint-Martin-du-Canigou, where he retired himself a short time before his death. The Abbey of Saint-Michel-de-Cuxa also owned a few allods in Odeillo, as recognized by a papal bull from Sergius IV in 1011.

Via remained a property of the Urg family until the 13th century. It was then bought by Peter of Fenouillet, viscount of Fenouillet and then viscount of Ille.

A chapel was mentioned for the first time in Font-Romeu in 1525, on the territory of Odeillo. It already hosted a statue of the Virgin Mary from the 13th century, and a hermitage was built from 1693 to receive the pilgrims.

Odeillo and Via both became communes in 1790. The commune of Via was abolished and included into Odeillo on 10 July 1822.

In 1881, a wildfire caused by arson spread throughout 267 hectares of the forest of La Calme in the north of the commune.

Demography

Solar power 
.

See also 
 Communes of the Pyrénées-Orientales department
 Arboretum de Font-Romeu

References

External links 

 L'invention d'une destination touristique

Communes of Pyrénées-Orientales